WFWG-LD, virtual and UHF digital channel 30, is a low-powered Defy TV affiliated station  television station licensed to Richmond, Virginia, United States. The station is owned by the DTV America subsidiary of HC2 Holdings.

History 
The station’s construction permit was initially issued on April 30, 2014 under the calls of W38FW-D. It was changed to the current WFWG-LD calls were assigned on February 8, 2017.

Digital channels
The station's digital signal is multiplexed:

References

External links
DTV America

Innovate Corp.
Low-power television stations in the United States
FWG-LD
Television channels and stations established in 2014
2014 establishments in Virginia
FWG-LD